Le Bon (French for "the Good") may refer to:
 Fulk II, Count of Anjou (circa 905–960), nicknamed Foulques le Bon
 John II of France (1319–1364), nicknamed Jehan le Bon
 Philip the Good (1396–1467), Duke of Burgundy; in French Philippe le Bon
 Joseph Le Bon (1765–1795), French politician
 Philippe LeBon (1767–1804), French engineer 
 Gustave Le Bon (1841–1931), French social psychologist, sociologist, and amateur physicist
 Simon Le Bon (1958–), singer with Duran Duran
 Yasmin Le Bon (1964–), British fashion model
 Cate Le Bon, Welsh singer
 Charlotte Le Bon (1986-), Canadian actress

See also 
 Lebon (disambiguation)
 Bon